Menneval is an unincorporated community in Restigouche County, New Brunswick, Canada, located about midway between Campbellton and Saint-Quentin on Route 17.

History

Notable people

See also
List of communities in New Brunswick

References

Communities in Restigouche County, New Brunswick
Designated places in New Brunswick
Local service districts of Restigouche County, New Brunswick